Tambura may refer to:

Musical string instruments
 Tanbur, a category of long-necked, string instrument originating in the Southern or Central Asia (Mesopotamia and Persia/Iran) 
 Tamboori, an Indian melodic instrument similar to a Tanpura
 Tanpura, a stringed drone instrument played in India
 Kurdish tanbur, used in Yarsan rituals
 Turkish tambur, an instrument played in Turkey
 Yaylı tambur, an instrument played in Turkey
 Tanbūra (lyre), an instrument played in East Africa and the Middle East
 Tambura saz, string instrument from the Bağlama family from Turkey 
Balkan tambura, an instrument used in the Balkan region (primarily used in Bulgaria)
 Tamburica, any member of a family of long-necked lutes popular in Eastern and Central Europe
 Tambouras, an instrument played in Greece

Other
 Tambura River, Romania
 Tumbura, a town in South Sudan
 Tumbura Airport, an airport serving the above town
 Tambur, an old name for Hemşin, a town in Rize Province, Turkey
 "Tambura", a hidden track from P.O.D.'s album The Fundamental Elements of Southtown

See also 
 Bandura, a Ukrainian instrument
 Dombra, an instrument in Kazakhstan, Siberia and Afghanistan
 Domra, a Russian instrument
 Pandura, an instrument played in Ancient Greece and other ancient civilisations from the Mediterranean basin
 Tambora (disambiguation)